This is a list of the school districts in Alaska.

Aleutians West Census Area

 Pribilof School District
 Unalaska City School District

Anchorage

 Anchorage School District
 Aleutian Region School District
 Chugach School District

Bethel Census Area

 Kuspuk School District 
 Lower Kuskokwim School District
 Yupiit School District

Chugach Census Area

 Cordova City School District
 Valdez City Schools

Dillingham Census Area

 Dillingham City School District
 Southwest Region School District

Hoonah-Angoon Census Area

 Hoonah City School District 
 Pelican City School District

Kusilvak Census Area

 Kashunamiut School District
 Lower Yukon School District
 Saint Mary's School District

Nome Census Area

 Bering Strait School District
 Nome Public Schools

Prince of Wales-Hyder Census Area

 Annette Island School District
 Craig City School District 
 Hydaburg City School District 
 Kake City School District
 Klawock City School District 
 Southeast Island School District

Sitka Borough

 Chatham School District
 Sitka Borough School District 
 Mount Edgecumbe High School

Southeast Fairbanks Census Area

 Alaska Gateway School District
 Delta/Greely School District

Yukon-Koyukuk Census Area

 Galena City School District
 Iditarod Area School District
 Nenana City School District
 Tanana City Schools
 Yukon Flats School District
 Yukon–Koyukuk School District

Single-District Boroughs

 Aleutians East Borough School District 
 Bristol Bay Borough School District
 Copper River School District
 Denali Borough School District
 Fairbanks North Star Borough School District
 Haines Borough School District
 Juneau School District
 Kenai Peninsula Borough School District
 Ketchikan Gateway Borough School District
 Kodiak Island Borough School District
 Lake and Peninsula School District
 Matanuska-Susitna Borough School District
 North Slope Borough School District
 Northwest Arctic Borough School District
 Petersburg City School District
 Skagway City School District
 Wrangell Public School District
 Yakutat School District

See also
 List of charter schools in Alaska
 List of high schools in Alaska

References

School districts in Alaska
Alaska
 
School districts in Alaska